Louisa Catherine Adams (née Johnson; February 12, 1775 – May 15, 1852) was the first lady of the United States from 1825 to 1829 during the presidency of John Quincy Adams.

Early life
 
Adams was born on February 12, 1775, in the City of London, the illegitimate daughter of Joshua Johnson, an American merchant from Maryland, whose brother Thomas Johnson later served as Governor of Maryland and United States Supreme Court Justice, and Catherine Newth, an Englishwoman, whose identity was long a mystery; her grandson Henry Adams joked that her existence was "one of the deepest mysteries of metaphysical theology." 

She was baptized as Louisa Catherine Johnson at the parish church of St Botolph without Aldgate on 9 March 1775, when her parents' names were recorded as Joshua and Catharine and their address was given as Swan Street. She had six sisters: Ann "Nancy," Caroline (mother of Union General Robert C. Buchanan, wife of Andrew Buchanan and later Nathaniel Frye), Harriet, Catherine, Elizabeth (second wife of United States Senator John Pope of Kentucky), and Adelaide, and a brother, Thomas. In 1778, when Louisa was three years old, her father moved the family to Nantes, France, due to his political views supporting the American Revolution. The family remained there for five years, establishing themselves as a strong social presence among diplomats and ambassadors.

Education 
Adams attended a Catholic boarding school as a child until her father's finances forced her and her siblings to leave and be educated by a governess. She became an avid reader excelled in arts and music.

Marriage and children

She met John Quincy Adams at her father's house in Cooper's Row, near Tower Hill, London. Her father had been appointed as United States consul general in 1790, and Adams first visited him in November 1795. Adams at first showed interest in her older sister but soon settled on Louisa. Adams, aged 30, married Louisa, aged 22, on July 26, 1797, at the parish church of All Hallows-by-the-Tower, on Tower Hill. Adams's father, John Adams, then President of the United States, eventually welcomed his daughter-in-law into the family, although they did not meet for several years.

Her parents left Europe in 1797 and went to the U.S. When her father was forced into bankruptcy, President John Adams appointed him as U.S. Director of Stamps. Her father, who suffered from mental illness, died in Frederick, Maryland, in 1802 of severe fever, leaving little provision for his family. Her mother died in September 1811, in her mid-fifties, and is buried in Rock Creek Cemetery.

During the course of her marriage, Louisa Adams had fifteen pregnancies, leading to ten miscarriages and four children. The children were:

 George Washington Adams (1801–1829), lawyer
 John Adams II (1803–1834), presidential aide
 Charles Francis Adams (1807–1886), diplomat, public official, and author
 Louisa Catherine Adams (August 12, 1811 – September 15, 1812),  the first American citizen born in Russia, born and died in St Petersburg, Russia, buried in the Lutheran Cemetery there.

Early married life 
Louisa was sickly, and suffered from migraine headaches and frequent fainting spells. She had several miscarriages over the course of her marriage. Having grown up in London and France,  she found Massachusetts dull and provincial, and referred to the Adams family home as being  "like something out of Noah's Ark". Nevertheless, she developed a warm affection for her father-in-law, and despite occasional differences, a deep respect for her mother-in-law Abigail Adams,  whom she later described as "the guiding planet round which we all revolved".

Three years after their marriage, the couple traveled to Berlin, Prussia, where she got her first taste of diplomacy and the duties of a diplomat's wife.

She left her two older sons in Massachusetts for education in 1809 when she took two-year-old Charles Francis Adams to Russia, where Adams served as a Minister. Despite the glamour of the tsar's court, she had to struggle with cold winters, strange customs, limited funds, and poor health. An infant daughter born in 1811 died the next year.

Peace negotiations called Adams to Ghent in 1814 and then to London. To join him, she made a forty-day journey across war-ravaged Europe by coach in winter. Roving bands of stragglers and highwaymen filled her with "unspeakable terrors" for her son. The next two years gave her an interlude of family life in the country of her birth.

When John Quincy Adams was appointed James Monroe's Secretary of State in 1817, the family moved to Washington, D.C. where Louisa's drawing room became a center for the diplomatic corps and other notables. Music enhanced her Tuesday evenings at home, and theater parties contributed to her reputation as an outstanding hostess.

First Lady of the United States
The pleasures of moving into the White House in 1825 were dimmed by the bitter politics of the election, paired with her deep depression. Though she continued her weekly "drawing rooms", she preferred quiet evenings of reading, composing music and verse, and playing her harp. As First Lady, she became reclusive and depressed. For a time, she regretted ever having married into the Adams family, the men of which she found cold and insensitive. The necessary entertainments were always elegant and her cordial hospitality made the last official reception a gracious occasion although her husband had lost his bid for re-election and partisan feeling still ran high.

In his diary for June 23, 1828, her husband recorded her "winding silk from several hundred silkworms that she has been rearing," evidently in the White House.

Since 1982 Siena College Research Institute has periodically conducted surveys asking historians to assess American first ladies according to a cumulative score on the independent criteria of their background, value to the country, intelligence, courage, accomplishments, integrity, leadership, being their own women, public image, and value to the president. Consistently, Adams has been ranked in the upper-half of first ladies by historians in these surveys. In terms of cumulative assessment, Adams has been ranked:
14th-best of 42 in 1982
16th-best of 37 in 1993
12th-best of 38 in 2003
21st-best of 38 in 2008
18th-best of 38 in 2014

In the 2014 survey, Adams and her husband were also ranked the 19th-highest out of 39 first couples in terms of being a "power couple".

Post-White House
After her husband lost reelection, Adams  thought that she would be retiring to Massachusetts permanently, but in 1831 her husband began seventeen years of service in the United States House of Representatives. The untimely deaths of her two oldest sons added to her burdens.

"Our union has not been without its trials," John Quincy Adams conceded. He acknowledged many "differences of sentiment, of tastes, and of opinions in regard to domestic economy, and to the education of children between us."  But added that "she always has been a faithful and affectionate wife, and a careful, tender, indulgent, and watchful mother to our children."

Travels 
Louisa Adams traveled with John Quincy Adams to Russia, Silesia (Poland), Germany, France, and England.

Political contributions 
In a time before modern political campaigns, some historians argue Louisa Catherine Adams served as her husband's unofficial campaign manager. She encouraged her husband to campaign, hosted parties at their house, and networked among political acquaintances.

Death
Her husband died at the United States Capitol on February 23, 1848, after having suffered a massive stroke two days earlier. He was 80 years old. He had a state funeral in Washington, DC, and then his body was carried by train to be entombed with his parents at United First Parish Church in Quincy.

She remained in Washington until her death of a heart attack on May 15, 1852, at the age of 77. The day of her funeral was the first time both houses of the United States Congress adjourned in mourning for any woman. She is entombed at her husband's side, along with her parents-in-law President John Adams and first lady Abigail Adams, in the United First Parish Church in Quincy, Massachusetts.

Legacy

First Spouse coin 

The First Spouse Program under the Presidential $1 Coin Act authorizes the United States Mint to issue -ounce $10 gold coins and medal duplicates to honor the first spouses of the United States.  Louisa Adams' coin was released May 29, 2008.

Museum collections 
Adams National Historical Park maintains Peacefield, the home Adams and her husband lived in some of the time later in their lives. The park has a bedspread on display at Peacefield which she made, as well as a painting of her by Edward Savage. For some time the painting was still owned by Adams's great-great granddaughter, Mrs. Henry L. Mason, and was loaned to the museum seasonally.

The Smithsonian's National Portrait Gallery holds several portraits of Louisa Catherine Adams, including a silhouette and a portrait on an ivory necklace.

Adams Memorial 
An Adams Memorial has been proposed in Washington, D.C., honoring John and Abigail Adams, John Quincy and Louisa Adams, and other members of their family.

Media portrayals 
Adams was portrayed by actress Caroline Corrie in the HBO miniseries John Adams.

Family tree

Writings
 The Diary and Autobiographical Writings of Louisa Catherine Adams: 1778–1850, two vols., The Adams Papers (Harvard University Press: 2013)
 Margaret A. Hogan and C. James Taylor, editors, A Traveled First Lady: Writings of Louisa Catherine Adams (Cambridge: Belknap Press, 2014)

References

Further reading

 Cook, Jane Hampton. American Phoenix: John Quincy and Louisa Adams, the War of 1812, and the Exile that Saved American Independence (Thomas Nelson: 2013)
 Heffron, Margery M. Louisa Catherine: The Other Mrs. Adams (Yale University Press, 2014) x, 416 pp.
 Nagel, Paul. The Adams Women: Abigail and Louisa Adams, Their Sisters and Daughters (Cambridge: Harvard University Press, 1987)
O'Brien, Michael. Mrs. Adams in Winter: A Journey in the Last Days of Napoleon (NY: Farrar, Straus and Giroux, 2010)
 Schneider, Dorothy, and Carl J. Schneider, First Ladies: A Biographical Dictionary (Facts on File: 2010), "Louis Catherine Johnson Adams", 42–52
 Thomas, Louisa. Louisa: The Extraordinary Life of Mrs. Adams (New York: Penguin, 2016).

External links

Louisa Adams at C-SPAN's First Ladies: Influence & Image

1775 births
1852 deaths
18th-century Unitarians
19th-century Unitarians
Burials in Massachusetts
British emigrants to the United States
First ladies of the United States
People from Boston
People from Calvert County, Maryland
People from Whitechapel
Thomas Johnson family
English people of American descent
People from the City of London
Adams political family